Yelniki is the name of several rural localities in Russia:-
Yelniki, Kaliningrad Oblast, a settlement in Kaliningrad Oblast
Yelniki, Republic of Mordovia, a selo in the Republic of Mordovia
Yelniki, name of several other rural localities